The Oceania Boxing Confederation (OCBC) is the Oceania governing body in amateur boxing. It is a member of the world governing body AIBA. It came into existence on the adoption of its constitution on February 16, 2009, taking over the functions of the former Oceania Amateur Boxing Association (OABA).
The Oceania Boxing Confederation is responsible for overseeing amateur boxing within the Oceania Region. Oceania is one of 5 Regional Confederations throughout the world. It is made up of 17 Nations within the Oceania Region.

The current President of the OCBC is Mr. Tauhiti Nena (President of the Polynesian Boxing Association). There are 2 Vice-Presidents and 6 Executive Committee members.

Events
 Oceanian Amateur Boxing Championships

References

External links
 

Amateur boxing organizations
National members of the International Boxing Association (amateur)
Sports governing bodies in Oceania
1966 establishments in Oceania
Sports organizations established in 1966